The Leetonia Exempted Village School District is a public school district serving Leetonia and surrounding Salem Township in northern Columbiana County in the U.S. state of Ohio.

Leetonia High School is the only high school in the district.  The schools' sports teams are nicknamed the "Bears". The district's colors are blue and white.

Schools

References

Education in Columbiana County, Ohio
School districts in Ohio
Public schools in Ohio